Tang Lixin (born August 1966) is a Chinese engineer currently serving as a professor and vice-president of Northeastern University.

Biography
Tang was born in Liaoning in August 1966. He earned a bachelor's degree in industrial automation in 1988, a master's degree in systems engineering in 1991, and a doctor's degree in control theory and application in 1996, all from Northeastern University. After graduating, he taught at the university, where he was promoted to associate professor in 1991 and to full professor in 1999. In November 2015 he was promoted to deputy dean of its School of Information Science and Engineering. In September 2017 he was promoted again to become vice-president of the university.

Honours and awards
 November 22, 2019 Member of the Chinese Academy of Engineering (CAE)

References

1966 births
Living people
Engineers from Liaoning
Northeastern University (China) alumni
Academic staff of the Northeastern University (China)
Members of the Chinese Academy of Engineering